Bern District (German: Amtsbezirk Bern, French: District de Berne, Italian: Distretto di Berna) was an administrative district in the canton of Bern, Switzerland.

Its capital was the city of Bern, which contains around half the population. The district consists of thirteen municipalities:

References

External links
 Website of the city of Bern (in English)

Former districts of the canton of Bern